Simon J. Kistemaker (October 21, 1930 – September 23, 2017) was a New Testament scholar. He served as Professor of New Testament at Reformed Theological Seminary. Kistemaker studied at Calvin College and Calvin Theological Seminary before obtaining a Th.D. from the Free University in Amsterdam. He served a term as president of the Evangelical Theological Society, and completed the New Testament Commentary series that was commenced by William Hendriksen. Four of Kistemaker's volumes in this series won the Gold Medallion Evangelical Book of the Year Award.
Kistemaker died at his home in St. Petersburg, Florida on September 23, 2017.

Works

Books

Articles & chapters

References

External links
Simon J. Kistemaker – Professor Interview at goingtoseminary.com.

1930 births
2017 deaths
American Calvinist and Reformed theologians
Calvin University alumni
Vrije Universiteit Amsterdam alumni
New Testament scholars
Bible commentators
20th-century Calvinist and Reformed theologians
21st-century Calvinist and Reformed theologians
American biblical scholars